The Appropriate Infrastructure Development Group (AIDG) provided access to environmentally friendly infrastructure in impoverished communities in developing countries through a combination of business incubation, education, and direct outreach. The AIDG's focus is the promotion of affordable and environmentally sound technologies to address gaps in basic services and infrastructure in rural areas of developing countries. The AIDG incubates businesses that provide renewable energy, water, and sanitation technologies to underserved communities, development agencies, and private individuals. The AIDG offers developing world design experience for university students interested in appropriate technology while providing hands-on assistance to rural communities in need.

Target population 
The AIDG aims to increase the use of environmentally sound infrastructure among rural agriculturalists who are currently unserved or underserved by large-grid water, electrical, and sanitation infrastructure. The AIDG aims to provide products and services affordable to populations living on under 2 dollars a day.

Programs 
The AIDG has three primary programs: business incubation, education, and community outreach.

Business Incubation.  AIDG's Business Incubation Program locates engineering talent in developing countries and helps them to form businesses that provide village and home-scale renewable energy and sanitation technologies to underserved communities, development agencies, and private individuals. The program provides seed capital, in the form of a recoverable grant, as well as comprehensive technical and logistical support over a two-year incubation period. After this period, interest-free repayments of the recoverable grant are paid back over 15 years and used to start new businesses in other geographic areas and regions.  The objective is to use this self-sustaining replication model to create a global network of micro-manufacturing facilities, known as workshops. The staff from previously incubated businesses will train employees at the new workshops to ensure that learning is propagated throughout the network. Workshops are set up as design-build facilities with a diverse product range, capable of adapting to fluctuations in demand and the needs of the local market. Investing in manufacturing facilities ensures that the long-term knowledge and productive resources required to fabricate, install, repair, and innovate much-needed infrastructure technologies are disseminated to the communities and individuals that need them the most. Each workshop facility serves as a focal point for the AIDG's community outreach and education programs in the region.
Education. The AIDG Education Program provides internship opportunities for qualified professionals, undergraduate, and graduate students. This program fosters information exchange between university students and faculty and workers at the AIDG's incubated businesses. Any new product innovations that are developed in concert with the internship program are disseminated to all of the workshops.  Through the Project Placement Program, students with novel designs are invited to manufacture and test the designs in one of the AIDG's incubated or post-incubation facilities. Designs are matched with interested communities for ongoing testing, and long-term performance information is relayed back to the student via the Internet.
Outreach.  Through the AIDG Outreach Program, workshop employees and volunteers perform infrastructure improvements for rural community organizations, such as schools, hospitals, and community centers. Such projects, while providing needed services, demonstrate the utility of the workshop's products and increase acceptance among the greater population. They help the workshop employees understand the needs of the target populations they are trying to serve. By contracting the workshop to do an outreach project, the AIDG provides a supplemental income stream to the workshop during its incubation period.

AIDG outreach projects are the basis for the group's TecoTours service-learning program. Through the TecoTours program, groups of volunteers interested in working in developing countries provide a tax-deductible gift to gain hands-on experience working on outreach projects. This program is an opportunity to develop a constant stream of financial support independent of foundation or grant revenue.

Though each program — business incubation, education, and outreach — is described separately, they are integrated to such a degree that none would be able to function alone. For example, the income generated by the TecoTour program supports the incubated workshops, which in turn provide a working space for employees and international volunteers. Community outreach serves to foster local demand for the workshop's products, while concurrently providing training to workshop employees. The incubated businesses provide a functional environment to run the internship and education programs, while the products from the Project Placement Program aid the research and development of products for the workshop.

Business Incubation: Xela Teco 

The AIDG began training at its first micro-manufacturing facility, XelaTeco, in Quetzaltenango (Xela) Guatemala in August 2005. Since then XelaTeco has produced biodigesters, windmills, high-efficiency stoves, pumps, water filters, solar LED lighting systems, and micro-hydro products. It is installing a micro-hydroelectric system to serve Communidad Nueva Alianza, a cooperative of 40 Guatemalan families.

XelaTeco comprises 10 Guatemalan workers, all highly skilled with university and technical school backgrounds, many lacking other viable work opportunities. The team is split between seven men and three women, with the varied skill set necessary for completing a variety of projects, from accounting and civil engineering to electronics and metal casting.

External links 
Official website
AIDG Technology Network
Founder and Executive Director

References 

Appropriate technology organizations
Business incubators